Philippe Rombi (born 3 April 1968) is a French film score composer. His score for Bienvenue chez les Ch'tis was nominated for best original score for a comedy film at the fifth International Film Music Critics Association (IFCMA) Awards for Excellence in 2008.

Filmography

References 

 Interviews at prombi.free.fr
 CD booklets

External links
 
 Philippe Rombi fan site (in both French and English)

1968 births
Living people
People from Pau, Pyrénées-Atlantiques
French composers
French male composers